The crude oil engine is a type of internal combustion engine similar to the hot bulb engine. A crude oil engine could be driven by all sorts of oils such as engine waste oil and vegetable oils. Even peanut oil and butter could be used as fuel if necessary. Like hot bulb engines, crude oil engines were mostly used as stationary engines or in boats/ships. They can run for a very long time; for instance, at the world fair in Milan in 1906, a FRAM engine was started and ran until the exhibition was over one month later. A crude oil engine is a low RPM engine dimensioned for constant running and can last for a very long time if maintained properly.

Modern crude oil engines
Large industrial diesel engines are capable of running on unrefined crude oil, and are widely used in the oil and gas industry. Additionally, many large diesel engines, such as the medium-speed and low-speed engines used on large ships, can also run on crude oil, although a lot of filtering and processing is done to the crude oil before it is pumped into the engine.

References

Engine technology
Internal combustion piston engines